Nina was a secret underground printing house in Baku, Russian Empire, established in July 1901 by the Baku Iskraist group, consisting of Lado Ketskhoveli, Leonid Krasin, Nikolay P. Kozerenko, Avel Yenukidze, Semyon Yenukidze, and Lev Halperin (Лев Ефимович Гальперин). Nina received direct assistance from Lenin and had contacts with the Tbilisi committee of the Russian Social Democratic Labour Party. 

At Nina, the illegal Georgian language newspaper Brdzola was printed, as well as an array of leaflets and pamphlets in Russian, Armenian and Georgian languages. Nina was temporarily shut down from April 1902 to December 1902. In 1903 it was occupied with printing the conference documents of the 2nd Congress of the Russian Social Democratic Labour Party, documents of the Caucasian League of RSDLP as well as works by Karl Marx, Friedrich Engels and Lenin.

After the 1903 RSDLP congress in Brussels and London, it came to function as the printing house of the Central Committee of the RSDLP. In total around 1.5 million copies of different publications were brought out by Nina. At the 3rd Congress of the Russian Social Democratic Labour Party, the legacy of Nina was praised. In January 1906 the central committee of the party decided to shut Nina down and moved its printing house to Saint Petersburg.

References

Publishing companies of Russia
Publications of the Communist Party of the Soviet Union
History of Baku
Printing companies
1901 establishments in the Russian Empire
1906 disestablishments
Underground press
Secret printing